Kafana is a small town and seat of the commune of Kofan in the Cercle of Sikasso in the Sikasso Region of southern Mali.

References

Populated places in Sikasso Region